Spencer Phillip Littleson (born May 29, 1998) is an American professional basketball player for Imortal Luzigas of the Liga Portuguesa de Basquetebol. He played college basketball for Toledo and Duquesne.

High school career
Littleson attended Rochester Adams High School. He grew from 5'10 to 6'3 during his freshman season. As a senior, he averaged 25.1 points, 6.3 rebounds, 3.2 assists, and 2.0 steals per game. Littleson finished third in the voting for 2016 Mr. Basketball of Michigan. He committed to play college basketball at Duquesne.

College career
As a freshman at Duquesne, Littleson averaged 1.6 points and 1.1 rebounds. Following the season he transferred to Toledo. Toledo coach Tod Kowalczyk called him an "unbelievable worker" and said they should have recruited him out of high school. As a sophomore, Littleson averaged 4.2 points and 2.2 rebounds per game. On November 10, 2019, he scored a career-high 27 points in an 96-70 win against Marshall. Littleson averaged 10.5 points per game as a junior. As a senior, Littleson averaged 13.4 points and 3.2 rebounds per game. He was named to the Second Team All-MAC and the MAC All-Defensive Team. Littleson led Division I with a school-record 103 three-point field goals and finished second nationally with a 47.2 three-point percentage. He was selected to participate in the State Farm 3-Point Championship.

Professional career
On June 28, 2021, Littleson signed his first professional contract with Limburg United of the BNXT League.

On August 28, 2022, Littleson signed with the Imortal Luzigas of the Liga Portuguesa de Basquetebol.

References

External links
Toledo Rockets bio
Duquesne Dukes bio

1998 births
Living people
American men's basketball players
Basketball players from Michigan
Duquesne Dukes men's basketball players
Limburg United players
People from Rochester Hills, Michigan
Shooting guards
Toledo Rockets men's basketball players